The village of Port Mathurin serves as the capital of the island of Rodrigues, a dependency of Mauritius. Most of the population of Rodrigues settles close to or in the city. It lies on the north coast of the Indian Ocean island and functions as the administrative, judicial and economic centre of Rodrigues. As the name suggests, it also operates the main harbour of the island.

Port Mathurin has a population of around 6,000 people (2006). Sights include its market, while the town also has the island's only bus station and a viewpoint on Mount Fanal, south of the town. There is a Roman Catholic church, an Anglican church, and a small mosque. Other landmarks of Port Mathurin include Marie, Queen of Rodrigues, a statue of the Virgin Mary located in Pointe Canon. The two ships of the Mauritius Cargo Handling Corporation, namely MV Mauritius Pride and Mauritius Trochetia, anchor at Port Mathurin five times every month.

On 1 May 1691, François Leguat and the first French landed on Rodrigues at the site of the future village, which was founded by French colonists in 1735. The place takes its name from that of an early French settler, either Mathurin Bréhinier or Mathurin Morlaix.

In 1901 Port Mathurin became home to offices for the Britain-Australia undersea cable.

There are 22 localities within the zone of Port Mathurin, which is one of 14 statistical subdivisions of Rodrigues, to which the population of 6,000 relates:
Baie Lascars (North)
Camp du Roi
Castor
Caverne Provert
Citronelle
Crève Coeur
Désiré
English Bay
Fond La Digue
Jentac
Mont Piton
Mont Vénus
Montagne Charlot
Montagne Fanal
Pointe Canon
Pointe Monnier
Port Mathurin
Roseaux
Solitude
Soupir
Terre Rouge
Vangar

The village (locality) has a single secondary school: Rodrigues College. Other  colleges operate in other villages around the island, namely Le Chou, Marechal, Grand Montagne, Mont Lubin and Citron Donis.

The locality of Port Mathurin proper occupies a very small area, and neighbouring settlements (localities) include Fond La Digue, Montagne Fanal, Pointe Monier, Camp du Roi and Baie Lascar.

In 1996, the Admiral Nevelskoi Yacht, ended his course in the lagoon next to Port Mathurin, after 2 years voyage crewless. This yacht, which was a property of the Russian government, was then given to Hon. Bernard Eric Typhis Degtyarenko in 2010, and also declared as a Maritime Museum by the Admiral Nevelskoi Maritime University. The yacht is now one of several historic links between Russia and Mauritius. It is important to emphasize that it is one of the most expensive yachts in the world in its category, including its historical importance, its value reaches more than several million dollars.

References

External links
Mysterra Magazine Tour of Port Mathurin (with photos)

Populated places in Rodrigues
Populated places in Mauritius
Populated places established in 1735